Elmapınar  is a small village in Mut district of Mersin Province, Turkey. The population of the village was 90 as of 2012. The economic activity of Elmapınar is agriculture. Ovine breeding is another activity.

References 

Villages in Mut District